The 1948 Tulsa Golden Hurricane football team represented the University of Tulsa during the 1948 college football season. In their third year under head coach Buddy Brothers, the Golden Hurricane compiled a 0–9–1 record, 0–1–1 against conference opponents, and finished in fourth place in the Missouri Valley Conference.

Schedule

References

Tulsa
Tulsa Golden Hurricane football seasons
College football winless seasons
Tulsa Golden Hurricane football